A hostage is a person seized by an abductor in order to compel another party, one which places a high value on the liberty, well-being and safety of the person seized—such as a relative, employer, law enforcement, or government—to act, or refrain from acting, in a certain way, often under threat of serious physical harm or death to the hostage(s) after expiration of an ultimatum. The Encyclopædia Britannica Eleventh Edition defines a hostage as "a person who is handed over by one of two belligerent parties to the other or seized as security for the carrying out of an agreement, or as a preventive measure against certain acts of war."

A party who seizes one or more hostages is known as a hostage-taker; if the hostages are present voluntarily, then the receiver is known as a host.

In civil society, along with kidnapping for ransom and human trafficking (often willing to ransom its captives when lucrative or to trade on influence), hostage taking is a criminal activity. In the military context, hostages are distinct from prisoners of war—despite prisoners being used as collateral in prisoner exchange—and hostage taking is regarded as a war crime.

On occasion, hostage taking is an impulsive act of desperation, as when a criminal act goes awry, the criminal has lethal force available, and a bystander becomes hasty collateral, despite the prospects for evading justice remaining poor, now soon surrounded by lethal force with intent as well as criminal prosecution for a serious additional crime, should the hostage taker survive the escalated stand-off (not always the intent; see suicide by cop). These confrontations are extremely dramatic, and are prominent in the public eye, despite being rather uncommon. Hostage taking is sometimes the only way to enact a plan, hence tactical, such as certain forms of prison escape, especially as treated in film.

At the other extreme, it can be an entirely calculated business venture by what amounts to organized crime. Before venturing into regimes known for lax rule of law, it is commonplace for affluent travellers and business persons to obtain kidnap and ransom insurance, though this will be less effective if the kidnapper's game plan transmutes into political extortion.

Parental child abduction is not generally considered hostage taking because there is usually no threat of harm to the child and no ultimatum concerning the return of the child (though there are cases where the leverage obtained within the failed parental relationship is more desired than the child), but otherwise hostage taking and kidnapping are prone to blend together. When the goal is strictly financial, the primary lens is one of extortion, even in the face of a severe threat to the safety of the captive person if the financial negotiation fails; conversely, when the goal is political or geopolitical, the primary lens is terrorism.

Etymology

Historical practices
The long history of political and military use indicates that political authorities or generals would legally agree to hand over one or usually several hostages in the custody of the other side, as guarantee of good faith in the observance of obligations. These obligations would be in the form of signing of a peace treaty, in the hands of the victor, or even exchange hostages as mutual assurance in cases such as an armistice. Major powers, such as Ancient Rome and European colonial powers would especially receive many such political hostages, often offspring of the elite, even princes or princesses who were generally treated according to their rank and put to a subtle long-term use where they would be given an elitist education or possibly even a religious conversion. This would eventually influence them culturally and open the way for an amicable political line if they ascended to power after release.

This caused the element gīsl = "hostage" in many old Germanic personal names, and thus in placenames derived from personal names, for example Isleworth in west London (UK) from Old English Gīslheres wyrð (= "enclosure belonging to [a man called] Gīslhere").

The practice of taking hostages is very ancient, and has been used constantly in negotiations with conquered nations, and in cases such as surrenders, armistices and the like, where the two belligerents depended for its proper carrying out on each other's good faith. The Romans were accustomed to take the sons of tributary princes and educate them at Rome, thus holding a security for the continued loyalty of the conquered nation and also instilling a possible future ruler with ideas of Roman civilization. The practice was also commonplace in the Imperial Chinese tributary system, especially between the Han and Tang dynasties.

The practice continued through the early Middle Ages. The Irish High King Niall of the Nine Hostages got his epithet Noígiallach because, by taking nine petty kings hostage, he had subjected nine other principalities to his power.

This practice was also adopted in the early period of company rule in India, and by France during the French colonization of North Africa. The position of a hostage was that of a prisoner of war, to be retained until the negotiations or treaty obligations were carried out, and liable to punishment (in ancient times), and even to death, in case of treachery or refusal to fulfil the promises made.

The practice of taking hostages as security for the carrying out of a treaty between civilized states is now obsolete. The last occasion was at the Treaty of Aix-la-Chapelle (1748), ending the War of the Austrian Succession, when two British peers, Henry Bowes Howard, 11th Earl of Suffolk, and Charles, 9th Baron Cathcart, were sent to France as hostages for the restitution of Cape Breton to France.

In France, after the revolution of Prairial (June 18, 1799), the so-called law of hostages was passed, to meet the royalist insurrection in La Vendée. Relatives of émigrés were taken from disturbed districts and imprisoned, and were liable to execution at any attempt to escape. Sequestration of their property and deportation from France followed on the murder of a republican, four to every such murder, with heavy fines on the whole body of hostages. The law only resulted in an increase in the insurrection. In 1796 Napoleon had used similar measures to deal with the insurrection in Lombardy.

In later times the practice of official war hostages may be said to be confined to either securing the payment of enforced contributions or requisitions in an occupied territory and the obedience to regulations the occupying army may think fit to issue; or as a precautionary measure, to prevent illegitimate acts of war or violence by persons not members of the recognized military forces of the enemy. 

During the Franco-Prussian War of 1870, the Germans took as hostages the prominent people or officials from towns or districts when making requisitions and also when foraging, and it was a general practice for the mayor and adjoint of a town which failed to pay a fine imposed upon it to be seized as hostages and retained until the money was paid. Another case where hostages have been taken in modern warfare has been the subject of much discussion. In 1870 the Germans found it necessary to take special measures to put a stop to train-wrecking by "Francs-tireurs" - i.e. "parties in occupied territory not belonging to the recognized armed forces of the enemy", which was considered an illegitimate act of war. Prominent citizens were placed on the engine of the train so that it might be understood that in every accident caused by the hostility of the inhabitants their compatriots will be the first to suffer. The measure seems to have been effective. In 1900 during the Second Boer War, by a proclamation issued at Pretoria (June 19), Lord Roberts adopted the plan for a similar reason, but shortly afterwards (July 29) it was abandoned.

The Germans also, between the surrender of a town and its final occupation, took hostages as security against outbreaks of violence by the inhabitants.

Most writers on international law have regarded this method of preventing such acts of hostility as unjustifiable, on the ground that the persons taken as hostages are not the persons responsible for the act; that, as by the usage of war hostages are to be treated strictly as prisoners of war, such an exposure to danger is transgressing the rights of a belligerent; and as useless, for the mere temporary removal of important citizens until the end of a war cannot be a deterrent unless their mere removal deprives the combatants of persons necessary to the continuance of the acts aimed at. On the other hand, it has been urged that the acts, the prevention of which is aimed at, are not legitimate acts on the part of the armed forces of the enemy, but illegitimate acts by private persons, who, if caught, could be quite lawfully punished, and that a precautionary and preventive measure is more reasonable than reprisals. It may be noticed, however, that the hostages would suffer should the acts aimed at be performed by the authorized belligerent forces of the enemy.

Article 50 of the 1907 Hague Convention on Land Warfare provides that: "No general penalty, pecuniary or otherwise, can be inflicted on the population on account of the acts of individuals for which it cannot be regarded as collectively responsible." The regulations, however do not allude to the practice of taking hostage.

In May 1871, at the close of the Paris Commune, took place the massacre of the so-called hostages. Strictly they were not hostages, for they had not been handed over or seized as security for the performance of any undertaking or as a preventive measure, but merely in retaliation for the death of their leaders E. V. Duval and Gustave Flourens. The massacre occurred after the defeat at Mont Valrien on the 4 April and the entry of the army into Paris on the 21 May. Among the 52 victims who were shot in batches the most noticeable were Georges Darboy, archbishop of Paris, the Abbé Deguery, curé of the Madeleine, and the president of the Court of Cassation, Louis Bernard Bonjean.

Legality of hostage-taking 

Taking hostages in modern terms is considered a crime or an act of terrorism; the use of the word in this sense of abductee became current only in the 1970s. The criminal activity is known as kidnapping. An acute situation where hostages are kept in a building or a vehicle that has been taken over by armed terrorists or common criminals is often called a hostage crisis.

Common Article 3 of the 1949 Geneva Conventions states that the taking of hostages during an internal conflict is a war crime and shall remain prohibited at any time and in any place whatsoever. In international conflicts, Articles 34 and 147 of the Fourth Geneva Convention state that using civilians as hostages is a grave breach of the convention. These conventions are supplemented by Article 75(2)(c) of Additional Protocol I in international conflicts and Article 4(2)(c) of Additional Protocol II in internal conflicts.

The International Convention against the Taking of Hostages—which prohibits hostage-taking and mandates the punishment of hostage-takers—was adopted by the United Nations General Assembly in 1979. The treaty came into force in 1983 and has been ratified by all but 24 of the member states of the United Nations.

Hostage-taking is still often politically motivated or intended to raise a ransom or to enforce an exchange against other hostages or even condemned convicts. However, in some countries hostage-taking for profit has become an "industry", ransom often being the only demand.

Hostage taking within diplomacy 
See Hostage diplomacy

Hostage-taking in the United States

Hostage Taking Act 
Generally, the Act applies to conduct occurring within the territory of the United States. However, under Subsection B, an offender may be indicted under the Act even if the hostage-taking occurred outside the territory of the United States if the "offender or the person seized or detained is a national of the United States; the offender is found in the United States; or the governmental organization sought to be compelled is the Government of the United States." These provisions are consistent with the fundamental principles of international criminal law, specifically active nationality principle, universal principle, and the effects principle, respectively.

18 USC 1203: Hostage Taking Act

Title 18 of the United States Code criminalizes hostage-taking under "18 USC 1203: Hostage Taking Act", which reads:

The Hostage Taking Act is a subsection of the International Convention Against the Taking of Hostages. It became enforceable in the United States January 6, 1985.

Other use 
In old Germanic peoples the word for "hostage" (gīsl and similar) sometimes occurred as part of a man's name: Ēadgils, Cynegils, Gīslheard, Gīslbeorht, etc.; sometimes when a man from one nation was hostage in another nation, his position as hostage was more or less voluntary: for example the position of Æscferð son of Ecglāf, who was a Northumbrian hostage in Wessex; he fought under Byrhtnōð against Vikings in the Battle of Maldon on 10 August 991 AD (ref. lines 265 etseq), and probably died in battle there.

See also Homeric Question, as Greek `Ομηρος means "Homer" and also "hostage".

Occasionally the word "hostage" is used metaphorically, for example: "The school did not buy the land because its headmaster missed the train to the meeting because of a road traffic accident; the whole matter thus proved to be hostage to one misbehaving carriage horse."

Dutch law
In Dutch law the state can take people 'hostage' (gijzeling in Dutch) to force people to appear in court or (in civil cases) if the person refuses to pay his or her debts. In the latter case, the person in question is imprisoned one day for each €50 that are owed without cancellation of the debt.

Notable hostages

Historical 
 Philip II of Macedon, held as hostage by the Thebes, led by Epaminondas and Pelopidas.
 Julius Caesar
 Atahualpa
 Miguel de Cervantes, author of Don Quixote
 Polybius, Greek historian
 Richard I of England, Richard the Lionheart, English king returning from the Third Crusade
 Patty Hearst
 Emperor Theodoric the Great
 Tokugawa Ieyasu, first Tokugawa shogun of Japan, spent his childhood as a hostage
 Vlad the Impaler and his brother Radu were held as hostages by the Ottoman Sultan during their childhood to guarantee the co-operation of their father

Recent times 
 Iran hostage crisis
 Iranian Embassy siege 
 Cokeville Elementary School hostage crisis
 Dawson's Field hijackings
 Japanese embassy hostage crisis
 Chavín de Huántar
 Moscow theater hostage crisis
 Beslan school hostage crisis
 Terry A. Anderson
 Ingrid Betancourt
 Terry Waite
 Manila hostage crisis
 Killing of captives by ISIL
 2014 Sydney hostage crisis
 Porte de Vincennes siege
 November 2015 Paris attacks
 Michael Spavor and Michael Kovrig

See also 
 Aircraft hijacking
 Carjacking
 CIA
 Collective punishment
 Countervalue
 FBI
 Foreign hostages in Afghanistan
 Foreign hostages in Iraq
 Foreign hostages in Nigeria
 Foreign hostages in Somalia
 Hostage MP
 Hostage Taking Act
 Iran hostage crisis
 Indian Airlines Flight 814
 Israel's raid on Entebbe
 Kidnapping
 Laws of war
 Lebanon Hostage Crisis
 Lima syndrome
 List of hostage crises
 Missing Iranian Diplomats
 Munich Massacre
 Prisoner of war
 Piracy
 Reprisal
 Stockholm syndrome
 Riot
 Terrorism
 Hostage diplomacy

References

External links

Hostage on the Etymology online dictionary

 
Kidnapping
Terrorism tactics